Claudia Alejandra Betancur Suescun (born June 13, 1987) is a Colombian rugby sevens player. She was a member of Colombia's women's national rugby sevens team for the 2016 Summer Olympics. She also competed at the 2015 Pan Am Games.

References

External links
 
 

1987 births
Female rugby sevens players
Rugby sevens players at the 2015 Pan American Games
Rugby sevens players at the 2016 Summer Olympics
Living people
Colombia international women's rugby sevens players
Colombia international rugby sevens players
Olympic rugby sevens players of Colombia
Pan American Games competitors for Colombia
21st-century Colombian women